Daniele Zoratto (born 15 November 1961) is an Italian association football coach and former player who played as a midfielder.

Personal life
Zoratto was born in Esch-sur-Alzette, Luxembourg as a son of Italian immigrants; his father worked there as a factory worker, while his mother was running a bar. At just nine months of age, he was however sent to Piobbico, Marche to live with his aunt as his parents had decided it was best for him to have an Italian education.

Career
Zoratto is best known as one of the AC Parma most prominent players during the early 1990s. Notably, he played for Parma from 1989, the year in which the gialloblu promoted to Serie A for their first time ever, to 1994, winning a European Super Cup and a Cup Winners' Cup with the team. He was also capped one time for the Italy national football team by coach Arrigo Sacchi for a 1994 FIFA World Cup qualification match against Switzerland.

In 2006, after a few years as Parma youth coach, he became head coach of Serie B club Modena F.C., with his old fellow player Luigi Apolloni, a former Italy international too, as assistant. Zoratto was however sacked in February 2007 because of lack of impressive results. In April 2008 he was re-appointed at the helm of Modena as replacement for Bortolo Mutti, sacked because of poor results.

He was confirmed at the helm of the canarini ( canaries ) for the 2008–09 season, however poor results and club problems led his team to a bottom-table place in the mid-season, this resulting to Zoratto and Modena parting company on January 26, 2009, with assistant manager Apolloni taking over from him.

In November 2009 he was appointed new assistant manager at Torino as part of the new coaching staff of new trainer Mario Beretta, a position he left in January 2010.

In August 2010 he was appointed as new head coach of the Italy U19 team.

References

1961 births
Living people
Sportspeople from Esch-sur-Alzette
Association football midfielders
Italian football managers
Italian footballers
Italy international footballers
Brescia Calcio players
Casale F.B.C. players
A.C. Cesena players
Calcio Padova players
Parma Calcio 1913 players
Rimini F.C. 1912 players
Serie A players
Serie B players
Serie C players
Modena F.C. managers
A.C. Bellaria Igea Marina players